Simmons University (previously Simmons College) is a private university in Boston, Massachusetts. It was established in 1899 by clothing manufacturer John Simmons. In 2018, it reorganized its structure and changed its name to a university. Its undergraduate program is women-focused while its graduate programs are co-educational.

Simmons is accredited by the New England Commission of Higher Education.

The university is divided into two campuses in the Fenway-Kenmore neighborhood totaling , one of which has five academic buildings and the other of which has nine Georgian-style residential buildings.

The university enrolls approximately 1,736 undergraduates and 4,527 graduate students. Its athletics teams compete in NCAA Division III as the Sharks.

History

Simmons was founded in 1899 with a bequest by John Simmons, a wealthy clothing manufacturer in Boston. Simmons founded the college based on the belief that women ought to live independently by offering a liberal arts education for undergraduate women to integrate into professional work experience. Sarah Louise Arnold was the school's first dean; she also served as national president of the Girl Scouts.

Simmons is a member of the Colleges of the Fenway consortium, which also includes Emmanuel College, Wentworth Institute of Technology, Massachusetts College of Pharmacy and Health Sciences, and Massachusetts College of Art and Design. Simmons absorbed Garland Junior College in 1976. Wheelock College, a former member, merged with Boston University to become the Boston University Wheelock College of Education & Human Development.

Simmons graduated its first African American student in 1914. Furthermore, Simmons was one of the few private colleges not to impose admission quotas on Jewish students for the first half of the 1900s.

The school's MBA program was the first in the world designed specifically for women. Today, the undergraduate program is women-centered, while the graduate schools are coed.

In 2014, Simmons College teamed up with for-profit online program manager 2U, a deal that would generate hundreds of millions of dollars in revenues for the school.

In November 2014, the institution released an explicit policy on the acceptance of transgender students, claiming a strong tradition of empowering women and challenging traditional gender roles and a "rich history of inclusion."  Its undergraduate program accepts applicants who are assigned female at birth as well as those who self-identify as women, making Simmons the third women-centered college in the United States to accept transgender women. Government documentation of gender is not required. Graduate programs are co-educational, so gender identity is not of concern.

In 2016, the MBA program went online as MBA@Simmons, and began admitting men.

In 2018, Simmons College changed its name to Simmons University after reorganizing the structure of the school.

At the onset of the COVID-19 pandemic, Simmons extended its Spring 2020 break to March 23 and then resumed instruction on a remote online-only basis.  The campus and residence halls were closed and all summer programs were cancelled. The 2020-2021 academic year featured online instruction for a majority of programs. For the Spring 2021 semester, the residence halls opened at 50% capacity.

Campus
Simmons University is divided into currently two campuses located in the Fenway-Kenmore neighborhood of Boston, Massachusetts. One campus is home to five academic buildings referred to as the Academic Campus. The other campus, referred to as the Residential Campus, is home to nine residential buildings for undergraduate students. The original site of the Simmons College Graduate School of Social Work is featured on the Boston Women's Heritage Trail. 

In November 2020, a plan for a single campus was launched by the university called One Simmons. This plan aims to combine the two campuses into a single campus and create a 21 story "Living and Learning Center." This will include 1,100 dorm rooms, classrooms, and athletic facilities. Additionally, the plan outlines renovations to the Main College Building and Lefavour Hall. Lefavour Hall specifically will be outfitted with a new library and a new state of the art science center. Following the completion of these renovations in spring of 2022, the Park Science Center has been closed. It is going to be taken down to build the new Living and Learning Center. The project is scheduled to break ground in Fall 2022 and open in 2025.

Additionally, Simmons University has come to an agreement with the company Skanska. They have partnered with the development firm to do two things. First, Skanska will build the new Living and Learning Center building. In exchange, Simmons University has given Skanska a 99 year lease for the grounds of the residential campus. Skanska will begin commercial development of the former residential campus after the construction of the Living and Learning Center.

Academic Campus
The Academic Campus is located at 300 The Fenway in the Longwood Medical Area. It is immediately adjacent to the Isabella Stewart Gardner Museum and the Boston Latin School. This campus currently consists of five buildings:

 One Palace Road
 Main College Building
 Beatley Library/Lefavour Hall (recently renovated to also house the science facilities)
 Park Science Center (currently inaccessible due to impending demolition)
 School of Management Building (a recent green construction)

Residential Campus
The Residence Campus is located one block from the main campus. It is near the Landmark Center and the Fenway and Longwood MBTA stations. The residence campus consists of 13 buildings centered on a grassy quad:
 Simmons Hall 
 Dix Hall 
 Smith Hall 
 Arnold Hall 
 North Hall 
 Health Center and Residence Life Offices
 Holmes Sports Center
 South Hall 
 Alumnae Hall 
 Bartol Dining Hall 
 Evans Hall 
 Mesick Hall 
 Morse Hall 

Most of the buildings on the residence campus serve as dormitories, but the campus also includes a large dining hall, a health center, a large fitness center, a public safety office, an auditorium, and several other facilities.

The residence campus is separated from the main campus by Emmanuel College and Merck Research Laboratories Boston.

Student body
According to the College Scorecard, the racial and ethnic composition of the undergraduate population is 62 percent white, 11 percent Asian, 8 percent Hispanic, 6 percent black, and 5 percent non-resident alien. Thirty percent of the undergraduate student body is Pell Grant eligible (meant for low-income students).

Sustainability
Simmons has made several significant sustainability efforts. Former President Susan Scrimshaw signed the American College and University Presidents Climate Commitment (ACUPCC) as a formal commitment to eliminate campus greenhouse gas emissions over time. Furthermore, the School of Management is addressing sustainability in its curriculum as well as in building and resource-management programs.

Simmons' environmental efforts earned the school a "C" on the College Sustainability Report Card 2010, published in Fall 2009 by the Sustainable Endowments Institute.

Academics
Simmons University is accredited by the New England Commission of Higher Education. Its most popular undergradate majors, by number out of 412 graduates in 2022, were:
Registered Nursing/Registered Nurse (117)
Family Practice Nurse/Nursing (47)
Biopsychology (25)
Exercise Science and Kinesiology (23)
Psychology (22)

Simmons University reorganized its academic structure in 2018 to foster interdisciplinary learning and cross-departmental collaboration among its constituent colleges:  

 College of Natural, Behavioral, and Health Sciences
School of Nursing
 College of Organizational, Computational, and Information Sciences
School of Library and Information Science (SLIS), est. 1902
School of Business
 College of Social Sciences, Policy, and Practice
School of Social Work
 The Gwen Ifill College of Media, Arts, and Humanities

Reputation and rankings

Athletics
Simmons University sponsors athletics teams in a variety of sports including crew, cross country, field hockey, lacrosse, soccer, softball, swimming & diving, tennis, and volleyball. The mascot is the Sharks and the colors are blue and yellow. They compete as members of the NCAA Division III in the Great Northeast Athletic Conference (GNAC), the New England Women's and Men's Athletic Conference (NEWMAC) and the Eastern College Athletic Conference (ECAC). Simmons athletes won some of the early national intercollegiate women's tennis championships in singles (Marjorie Sachs, 1932) and doubles (Dorrance Chase, 1930 and 1932, with Sachs).

Notable alumni
Simmons alumni include:
 Susan Porter Benson (1943–2005), historian
 Julie Berry (author), children's author
 Lenore Blum (born 1942), computer scientist and mathematician
 Kristin Cashore, author
 Margaret Curtis (1883-1965), social worker and athlete
 Jahaira DeAlto (died 2021), social worker, lgbt activist, and domestic violence victims' advocate
 Denise Di Novi (born 1956), film producer
 Rehema Ellis, NBC News correspondent
 Dorothy Celeste Boulding Ferebee (1898–1980), class of 1920, African-American physician and activist
 David S. Ferriero (born 1949) 10th Archivist of the United States
 Nnenna Freelon (born 1954), jazz singer
 Ann M. Fudge, businesswoman, former CEO of Young & Rubicam
 Tipper Gore (born 1947), attended (Garland Junior College), former Second Lady of the United States
 Eolyn Klugh Guy, social worker associated with YWCA
 Christine Heppermann, author and poet
 Theodora Kimball Hubbard, landscape architect, librarian
 Marjorie Hulsizer Copher, dietitian who served in World War I
 Gwen Ifill (1955–2016), class of 1977, journalist, television newscaster and author
 Louise Andrews Kent (1886–1969), author
 Mackenzi Lee, author
 Gail Levin, class of 1969, art historian
 Elinor Lipman (born 1950), novelist
 Bertha Mahony (1882–1969), founder of The Horn Book Magazine
 Barbara Margolis (1929–2009), prisoners' rights advocate who served as the official greeter of New York City.
 Hannah M. McCarthy, college administrator and businessperson
 Jeffrey Mello, Episcopal priest (Bishop of Connecticut)
 Eleanor Milleville (1922–1991), American sculptor
 Catherine N. Norton (1941–2014), American librarian
 Sondra Perl, Professor Emerita of English at Lehman College and director of the Ph.D. in Composition and Rhetoric at the Graduate Center of the City University of New York.
 Bertha Reynolds, American social worker
 Srinagarindra (1900–1995), Princess Mother of Thailand
 Mabel Leilani Smyth, Director of the Public Nursing Service for the Territory of Hawaii
 Valerie Thomas, scientist and inventor
 Susan Traverso (1983), President of Thiel College, former Provost of Elizabethtown College
 Suzyn Waldman, color commentator for the New York Yankees
 Allyson Schwartz, class of 1970, U.S. Representative Pennsylvania's 13th congressional district 2004–
 Anne Williams Wheaton, class of 1912, publicist and first White House Associate Press Secretary
 Esther M. Wilkins (1916–2016), class of 1938, pioneer in the field of dental hygiene, teacher, and author of Clinical Practice of the Dental Hygienist
 Mary Elizabeth Wood, 1861–1931, librarian and lay missionary who actively promoted Chinese early education and librarianship
 Alex Wright, American writer and information architect
 Aline A. Yamashita, Guamanian educator and politician.
Jill Zarin, Philanthropist and Business Women. Former Cast Member of the Bravo reality show The Real House Wives of New York City.

Notable faculty
 William M. Bellamy, former U.S. ambassador to Kenya from 2003 to 2006
 Harry C. Bentley, founder and namesake of Bentley College served as professor of accounting.
 Nancy Bond, winner of a Newbery Honor, taught at the Simmons College Center for the Study of Children's Literature from 1979 to 2001.
 Dana Chandler, artist and activist.
 Alicia Craig Faxon, art historian.
 Emily Hale, speech and drama teacher, and muse of T.S. Eliot
 Gregory Maguire, author, professor and co-director at the Simmons College Center for the Study of Children's Literature from 1979–1985.
 Isadore Gilbert Mudge, librarian, part-time lecturer
 Mary Schenck Woolman, pioneer in vocational education

See also
 Simmons College Center for the Study of Children's Literature

References

External links
 

 
Women's universities and colleges in the United States
Universities and colleges in Boston
Educational institutions established in 1899
1899 establishments in Massachusetts
Liberal arts colleges in Massachusetts
Private universities and colleges in Massachusetts